The Honor Student at Magic High School is a 2021 Japanese anime series of the spin-off manga series of the same name written by Yu Mori and a spin off of The Irregular at Magic High School. After the end of The Irregular at Magic High School, it was revealed that the spin-off manga series, The Honor Student at Magic High School would get an anime television series adaptation, which aired from July 3 to September 25, 2021 on Tokyo MX and other channels. The series is animated by Connect and directed by Hideki Tachibana, with Tsuyoshi Tamai writing and overseeing the series' scripts, Ryōsuke Yamamoto and Takao Sano designing the characters, and Taku Iwasaki returning to compose the series' music. The opening theme is "101" performed by Sangatsu no Phantasia while the ending theme is "Double Standard" performed by Philosophy no Dance.

Episodes

See also
List of The Irregular at Magic High School episodes

References

Honor Student at Magic High School, The